Ilog, officially the Municipality of Ilog,  is a 2nd class municipality in the province of Negros Occidental, Philippines. According to the 2020 census, it has a population of 59,855 people.

Founded by the Augustinian friars Gerónimo Marín and Francisco Bustos on May 16, 1584, it was the first capital of the historical military district/province of Negros in the late 18th century. The name Ilog (or Ylog, Tagalog for "river") was recommended by a Tagalog guide of the Spaniards because the place was entirely surrounded by the longest river on the whole Negros Island, the Hilabangan River. The first inhabitants of Ilog are mostly migrants from Panay island.

Geography

Barangays
Ilog is politically subdivided into 15 barangays.
 Andulauan
 Balicotoc
 Bocana
 Calubang
 Canlamay
 Consuelo
 Dancalan
 Delicioso
 Galicia
 Manalad
 Pinggot
 Barangay I (Poblacion)
 Barangay II (Poblacion)
 Tabu
 Vista Alegre

Climate

Demographics

Hiligaynon is the major language of the city, with differences in tone and accent from the Hiligaynon used in Metro Bacolod. Filipino and English are widely taught.

Economy

Tourism
The Kisi-Kisi Festival is celebrated every 25 March. “Kisi-kisi” is a Hiligaynon term for the fast movement of crustaceans such as fish, prawns, crabs and shrimps that is abundant in the municipality. The main attraction of the festival is the Kisi-Kisi streetdancing parade competition among barangays that pays tribute to its rich marine resources. The town fiesta also honors the Señor Santo Niño as their patron saint, that is why, before the dance parade a re-enactment of Sinulog is staged to show how their village was saved from the Moro pirates. Another exciting event to look forward to during the opening day of the Kisi-Kisi Festival is the "eat-all-you-can oysters" (referred by tourists as Ilog Talaba Festival) which is open to all visitors. Freshly steamed oysters are served on a long bamboo table for those who would like to savor the seafood. Kisi-Kisi was started by Councilor Mark G. Vargas to help Ilog's tourism.

References

External links
 [ Philippine Standard Geographic Code]
Philippine Census Information
Local Governance Performance Management System 

Municipalities of Negros Occidental